James William "Junior" Gilliam (October 17, 1928 – October 8, 1978) was an American second baseman, third baseman, and coach in Negro league and Major League Baseball who spent his entire major league career with the Brooklyn / Los Angeles Dodgers. He was named the 1953 National League Rookie of the Year, and was a key member of ten National League championship teams from 1953 to 1978. As the Dodgers' leadoff hitter for most of the 1950s, he scored over 100 runs in each of his first four seasons and led the National League in triples in 1953 and walks in 1959. Upon retirement, he became one of the first African-American coaches in the major leagues.

Negro leagues
Born in Nashville, Tennessee, Gilliam began playing on a local semi-pro team at age 14 and dropped out of high school in his senior year to pursue his baseball career. He joined the Negro National League's Baltimore Elite Giants, with whom he played from 1946 to 1950. He received his nickname, "Junior", during this time. He was voted an All-Star three straight years from 1948 to 1950. Veteran George Scales taught him to switch hit.

Minor leagues
In 1951, he was signed as an amateur free agent by the Brooklyn Dodgers, who sent him to play for their Triple-A International League farm team, the Montreal Royals; he could not play for the Dodgers' Double-A affiliate, the Fort Worth Cats, as blacks were still barred from the Texas League. He led the International League in runs in both 1951 and 1952.

Brooklyn Dodgers
Gilliam made his debut with the Dodgers in April 1953, with the formidable task of taking over second base from Jackie Robinson, who was shifted to the outfield and third base; he proved capable, batting .278 with a team-leading 125 runs for the National League champions. His 17 triples led the National League, and remain the most by a Dodger since 1920; he was second in the league (behind Stan Musial) with 100 walks, and third with 21 stolen bases. For his excellent season he earned National League Rookie of the Year honors, as well as The Sporting News Rookie of the Year Award.

He continued to play well during the team's Brooklyn years, batting .282 in 1954 with a career-high 13 home runs before slipping to a .249 average for the 1955 champions; he scored over 100 runs both years, as well as in 1956. With the 1956 pennant winners, he batted a career-best .300 and made his first major league All-Star team, also finishing fifth in voting for the Major League Baseball Most Valuable Player Award; he was again second in the league in walks (95, behind teammate Duke Snider) and steals (21, behind Willie Mays). On July 21 of that year, he tied John Montgomery Ward's 1892 major league record of 12 assists in a game. In the Dodgers' last season in Brooklyn in 1957, he batted .250 but led the National League  in putouts and fielding percentage and again finished second behind Mays in stolen bases.

Los Angeles Dodgers

He continued to star with the team after their 1958 move to Los Angeles, though he gradually shifted to third base; for the 1959 champions he led the National League in walks (96), along with 23 steals, and was again an All-Star, hitting a home run in that year's second All-Star Game. During the team's Los Angeles years, he moved back to second base from 1961 to 1963, batting .282 in the 1963 pennant year and placing sixth in that year's MVP vote; he also relinquished the leadoff role to Maury Wills in the 1960s, instead batting second in the order.

Gilliam was named a coach after the 1964 season, and intended to end his playing career, but team injuries resulted in his seeing substantial play at third base in 1965 and 1966, with the team again winning the National League championship in both seasons. In 1965 he was part of the major leagues' first all-switch-hitting infield, with shortstop Wills, first baseman Wes Parker, and second baseman Jim Lefebvre. On September 5, Gilliam hit a 2-run pinch triple in a road game against the Houston Astros, giving the Dodgers a 3–2 lead in the ninth inning; the Los Angeles Rams, playing a preseason game against the Philadelphia Eagles at the Coliseum, were playing so poorly despite their 10–0 win that the biggest cheer from the stands came from people listening to portable radios tuned to the Dodger game who cheered when Gilliam got the hit.

He finally retired as a player following the 1966 season with a .265 career batting average, 1,889 hits, 1,163 runs, 65 home runs, 558 runs batted in, 304 doubles, 71 triples, 1,036 walks, and 203 stolen bases over 14 seasons. Defensively, he recorded an overall .973 fielding percentage.

Post-season games
Gilliam played in seven World Series with the Dodgers, four of them against the New York Yankees. In the 1953 World Series he singled to lead off Game 1, and had a solo homer in the fifth inning batting left-handed. He hit three doubles, scoring once and driving in two runs, in the 7–3 Game 4 victory; he had another homer, this time batting right-handed, in the 11–7 loss in Game 5. In Game 3 of the 1955 World Series, he drew a walk with the bases loaded in the second inning to give the Dodgers the lead for good, and he drove in the first run of the 8–5 Game 4 win; the Dodgers won in seven games for their first Series championship. In the 1956 World Series, he walked with one out in the tenth inning of Game 6 and scored on a single by Robinson to give the Dodgers a 1–0 victory, tying the Series; in Game 5, he struck out and grounded out twice in the perfect game pitched by the Yankees' Don Larsen. In the 1963 World Series, he scored the only run of Game 3 in the first inning, after walking and advancing to second base on a wild pitch; after advancing all the way to third base on an error by Joe Pepitone in the seventh inning of Game 4, he scored on a Willie Davis sacrifice fly to give the Dodgers a 2–1 win and a Series sweep. He was also on Dodgers teams which won the Series in 1959 against the Chicago White Sox and 1965 against the Minnesota Twins. His final major league appearance was in Game 2 of the 1966 World Series against the Baltimore Orioles.

Coach
Gilliam served as a player-coach beginning in 1964, and became a full-time coach in 1967. He continued as a coach with the Dodgers until his death in 1978, including three more Dodger pennant teams in 1974, 1977, and 1978; they lost the World Series in each year.

Death and legacy
Gilliam suffered a massive brain hemorrhage at his home on September 15, 1978, and, following surgery, lapsed into a coma from which he did not recover. He died in Inglewood, California, nine days before his 50th birthday, one day after the Dodgers clinched their tenth pennant during his tenure in the 1978 National League Championship Series. His uniform number 19 was retired by the Dodgers two days after his death, prior to Game 1 of the 1978 World Series. His number is one of two retired by the Dodgers of a player not in the Hall of Fame (Fernando Valenzuela is the other). He is interred in the Inglewood Park Cemetery.

Gilliam was respected for his personal qualities and sportsmanship, in addition to his playing ability, over his 28-year career with the Dodgers. Quotations about him include the following:

The book Carl Erskine's Tales from the Dodgers Dugout: Extra Innings (2004) includes short stories from former Dodger pitcher Carl Erskine. Gilliam is prominent in many of these stories.

In 1981, the City of Los Angeles dedicated a park in honor of Junior Gilliam's legacy.  In 1984 the Jim Gilliam Park opened to the public, and is  located on La Brea Avenue.  The Jim Gilliam Park is marked by several facilities named after him.  The first ball ceremony was thrown by the Honorable Tom Bradley, Mayor of Los Angeles (1973–1993).

On May 21, 2015, the Nashville Metro Council passed an ordinance renaming a part of Jackson Street between Second Avenue and to an alley slightly past Fifth Avenue to "Junior Gilliam Way". The center part of this stretch named for Gilliam is the location of Nashville's First Horizon Park, a minor league baseball stadium built in 2015 for the Triple-A Nashville Sounds.

See also
 List of Negro league baseball players who played in Major League Baseball
List of Major League Baseball career runs scored leaders
List of Major League Baseball annual triples leaders
List of Major League Baseball career stolen bases leaders
List of Major League Baseball players who spent their entire career with one franchise

References
 Baseball: The Biographical Encyclopedia (2000). Kingston, New York: Total/Sports Illustrated. .

External links
 or Seamheads
Jim Gilliam at SABR (Baseball BioProject)
Jim Gilliam at Baseball Almanac
Jim Gilliam at Baseballbiography.com

  

1928 births
1978 deaths
African-American baseball coaches
African-American baseball players
Baltimore Elite Giants players
Baseball players from Nashville, Tennessee
Brooklyn Dodgers players
Burials at Inglewood Park Cemetery
Cangrejeros de Santurce (baseball) players
Liga de Béisbol Profesional Roberto Clemente infielders
Los Angeles Dodgers coaches
Los Angeles Dodgers players
Major League Baseball coaches with retired numbers
Major League Baseball first base coaches
Major League Baseball hitting coaches
Major League Baseball players with retired numbers
Major League Baseball second basemen
Major League Baseball Rookie of the Year Award winners
Major League Baseball third basemen
Montreal Royals players
National League All-Stars
American sportsmen
International League MVP award winners
20th-century African-American sportspeople